"La Que Nunca Se Rinde" is a song by Spanish recording artist Marta Sánchez. It was released as a single from her upcoming seventh studio album on September 24, 2014 through digital distribution. The song was written by Sánchez and produced by Pablo Ochando.

Chart performance

References 

Marta Sánchez songs
2014 singles